Third Balkan War may refer to:

 Yugoslav Wars, or any of the individual wars, stemming from the breakup of Yugoslavia in the 1990s
 Balkans theatre of World War I in the 1910s

See also
 Balkan Wars